Dovania neumanni is a moth of the family Sphingidae. It is known from forests in Ethiopia.

The length of the forewings is 24–26 mm. It is similar to Dovania poecila, but smaller and with thicker antennae. The hindwings are olive brown and the pale abdominal bands are much less conspicuous.

References

Endemic fauna of Ethiopia
Sphingini
Moths described in 1925
Insects of Ethiopia
Moths of Africa
Taxa named by Karl Jordan